Ivan Ivanov (born August 24, 1986 in Sofia) is an amateur Bulgarian Greco-Roman wrestler, who competed in the men's super heavyweight category. Ivanov qualified for the men's 120 kg class at the 2008 Summer Olympics in Beijing, after placing third from the Olympic Qualifying Tournament in Novi Sad, Serbia. He received a bye for the preliminary round of sixteen, before losing out to France's Yannick Szczepaniak, with a classification point score of 1–3.

References

External links
Profile – International Wrestling Database
NBC 2008 Olympics profile

Bulgarian male sport wrestlers
1986 births
Living people
Olympic wrestlers of Bulgaria
Wrestlers at the 2008 Summer Olympics
Sportspeople from Sofia